Nathaniel Hill (1861–1934) was an Irish impressionist painter.

Life
Hill was born in Drogheda, Ireland. From 1877 to 1880 he studied at the Metropolitan School of Art in Dublin, where he was a contemporary of Roderic O'Conor, Walter Osborne, and Joseph Malachy Kavanagh. During the 1880s he made visits to Brittany in the company of Osborne and O'Conor. He painted rural scenes, as well as peasants and country imagery. A fine example of his portrait style  - Hill's late 19th Century portrait of the brewer and banker Thomas Plunkett Cairnes - is held at the Highlanes Gallery, Drogheda. This work is one of his portraits of prominent Drogheda citizens of that period.

Hill died at Betws-y-Coed, North Wales, in 1930.

Notes and references

Sources
"Nathaniel Hill (1861-1934)", 29 January 2000. <http://go.to/Irish> Retrieved 2 August 2006.
"The Irish Impressionists, Irish Artists in France and Belgium 1850-1914". Julian Campbell. National Gallery of Ireland. 1984
"Irish Art from Nathaniel Hone to Nano Reid: The Drogheda Municipal Art Collection in Context". Dr Denise Ferran. Highlanes Gallery (Drogheda). 2006

External links
Nathaniel Hill Short Bio
Nathaniel Hill at Irish Art
Highlanes Gallery at www.highlanes.i.e. Highlanes Gallery

1861 births
1934 deaths
People from Drogheda
19th-century Irish painters
20th-century Irish painters
Irish male painters
Irish Impressionist painters
19th-century Irish male artists
20th-century Irish male artists